The North Island snipe (Coenocorypha barrierensis), also known as the little barrier snipe or tutukiwi, is an extinct species of bird in the sandpiper family, Scolopacidae, that was endemic to New Zealand.

Taxonomy and etymology
Examination of the taxonomy of Coenocorypha snipe has been hindered by lack of material, erroneous locality data, misidentified specimens and confused nomenclature.  The North Island snipe was described in 1955 by Walter Oliver as a subspecies of the Subantarctic snipe (Coenocorypha aucklandica), but has since been elevated to a full species, with fossil material from the North Island referred to it.  The specific epithet and older common name refer to the type locality.

Distribution and extinction
The North Island snipe is extinct.  Its prehistoric distribution comprised the North Island where subfossil remains have been found in several places.  It became extinct on the mainland of North Island following the occupation of New Zealand by Polynesians (the ancestors of the Māori people) and the associated introduction of Pacific rats (Rattus exulans).  It survived on at least one small island, Little Barrier Island in the Hauraki Gulf, until 1870 where the type (and only existing) specimen was taken.  According to Oliver, “About 1870 two snipe were seen on Little Barrier Island by Captain Bennett of the schooner Mary Ann.  One was captured alive but died in captivity, the other escaped.  The captured specimen was presented to the Auckland Museum by Mr T.B. Hill and is the basis of the following account.”

Description
Oliver described the North Island snipe as being generally similar to other Coenocorypha snipes.  He added that it differed from the South Island snipe in the “greater area of buffy white on chin and throat, the absence of bars on the lower abdomen, the crescent-shaped markings on the upper abdomen and the less rufous general coloration”.

References

Notes

Sources
 
 
 
 
 

Coenocorypha
Birds of the North Island
Extinct birds of New Zealand
Bird extinctions since 1500
Species made extinct by human activities
Birds described in 1955
Species endangered by invasive species
Taxa named by Walter Oliver